Un bugiardo in paradiso is a 1998 Italian comedy film directed by Enrico Oldoini.

Cast

References

External links

1998 films
Films directed by Enrico Oldoini
1990s Italian-language films
1998 comedy films
Italian comedy films
1990s Italian films